Ageless computing refers to a section of user experience design focused around designing computer software for the elderly. This type of software addresses age specific challenges, and allows easier interaction with computers as we age.

Overview 
Many existing computing services are not designed with the needs of elderly users in mind. The way information is often organized and presented (such as user experience design) and the complexity of many computer-based operations create difficulties for many elderly people. This not only makes it inconvenient for the elderly to make use of information and services but also contributes to isolation from other members of society.

As the average life expectancy increases in most countries across the globe, a greater percentage of the world's population is falling above the age of 65. This group commands major purchasing power, and possesses unique knowledge, experience, skills, and wisdom. As such, computing design paradigms must be revised to accommodate the special needs and preferences of the elderly population for the well-being of both seniors and society in general.

Definition 
Ageless computing is defined as any service-oriented computing design that can achieve at least one of the following objectives:

Bridges the gap between physical services for the elderly and the online environment
Enables the elderly to effectively use computing technology without conscious physical and mental effort
Enables friends and relatives of the elderly to interact closely and meaningfully with the elderly
Enables aging societies to mobilize the elderly population as a productive force

Ageless computing should make the elderly feel ageless when using computing technologies, make their loved ones feel the elderly are ageless as part of daily life and make an aging society feel ageless by revealing the hidden potential of the elderly population.

Implications for UI/UX Design
UI/UX designers can alienate senior citizens from the online experience if they do not consider their needs.  In the United States in 2016, 65% of senior citizens were online, and 40% of seniors use smartphones. Good UI design for senior citizens mostly follows general UI principles, but some of these are especially magnified due to the unique physical and mental capabilities of older adults.

A common symptom experienced as we age is a loss in fine motor function control. This means that using mice and touchpads can be substantially more difficult to do accurately among the elderly. In order to combat this, UI/UX designers should remember to make clickable elements large and spaced far enough apart to prevent accidental clicks.

Generally, as vision fails due to age, senior citizens will choose to have text display larger than younger users. If possible, incorporating larger text sizes and greater contrast into the design can substantially reduce frustration felt by older users while navigating the software.

Navigation should be prominent and easy to recognize and remember. Sometimes, even seemingly basic navigation patterns such as the scroll bar can be lost on the elderly. Do not assume any innate knowledge from the user. Design your navigation to be consistent and memorable to avoid confusion when navigating your site.

In contrast to younger users, senior citizens are more likely to use tablets than smartphones. Applications designed for multiple screen sizes should support tablet use when following ageless computing principles.

Design Elements for Ageless Computing
UI/UX designers can help contribute to ageless computing through simple design that is intuitive for users of all ages.  The following design elements can help to include the elderly:

Font Size and Style: Senior citizens benefit from larger font sizes due to the increased legibility.  Some smartphone screen sizes make this a particular challenge for older adults. Default font styles (such as Roboto for Android devices) are generally the easiest to read.
Color and Contrast: The ability to distinguish certain colors fades with age.  Colors and contrast can help guide users to specific design elements needed to perform tasks and remind them where they have navigated.
Language: The use of slang or lingo that is intuitive for younger populations will likely confuse senior citizens.  The language used in a computing system should communicate its intended message to an older population.
Clickable Elements: Diminished hand-eye coordination and motor skills can make it difficult for seniors to navigate with a mouse.  Interface elements should be at least 11 millimeters diagonally with at least 2 millimeters between elements. Scrolling can also present issues for the elderly due to the small size of the scroll bar and should be avoided when possible.  If needed, they should be simple and provide the user with multiple scrolling options.
Icons: In ageless computing, icons should be simple and universal in meaning.  Textual labels can be added to icons but should be short in length.
Navigation: It can be challenging for older users to know where they are in a system and how to get to their desired destination.  Classic navigation elements such as a vertical sidebar are useful.  A back button can also provide an escape route for users if they get stuck.  Elderly users will also be more skeptical of new applications than younger users, so the onboarding process should be quick and easy.
Cues, Noises and Reminders: Sounds incorporated into computing systems should be loud enough for users with diminished hearing; options for users to control volume level can be an effective tactic.  Notifications, alerts, and reminders can help ensure regular use of a new application for seniors.
Social Networks: Older users generally have a smaller, more trusted social network than members of younger generations.  Designs should keep this difference in mind in implementing privacy and security features.

Opportunities
Although many people will use ageless computing principles in general software, it can also be used for very specialized purposes. One opportunity would be in health care technology, creating software to make it easier for the elderly to manage medications, pace makers, insulin pumps, and more. Video game rehabilitation integrates rehabilitation practices into popular gaming platforms for stroke recovery, neurological conditions, etc.  Studies have shown that these technologies can also aid the elderly in areas such as balance, cognition, social interaction, entertainment, and more.

References

Computing and society